Arvo Pärt (born 11 September 1935) is an Estonian composer of contemporary classical music. Since the late 1970s, Pärt has worked in a minimalist style that employs tintinnabuli, a compositional technique he invented. Pärt's music is in part inspired by Gregorian chant. His most performed works include Fratres (1977), Spiegel im Spiegel (1978), and Für Alina (1976). From 2011 to 2018, Pärt was the most performed living composer in the world, and the second most performed in 2019—after John Williams. The Arvo Pärt Centre, in Laulasmaa, was opened to the public in 2018.

Early life, family and education 
Pärt was born in Paide, Järva County, Estonia, and was raised by his mother and stepfather in Rakvere in northern Estonia. He began to experiment with the top and bottom notes of the family's piano as the middle register was damaged.

Pärt's musical education began at the age of seven when he began attending music school in Rakvere. By his early teenage years, Pärt was writing his own compositions. His first serious study came in 1954 at the Tallinn Music Middle School, but less than a year later he temporarily abandoned it to fulfill military service, playing oboe and percussion in the army band. After his military service he attended the Tallinn Conservatory, where he studied composition with Heino Eller and it was said of him, "he just seemed to shake his sleeves and the notes would fall out". During the 1950s, he also completed his first vocal composition, the cantata Meie aed ('Our Garden') for children's choir and orchestra. He graduated in 1963.

Career
As a student, Pärt produced music for film and the stage. From 1957 to 1967, he worked as a sound producer for the Estonian public radio broadcaster Eesti Rahvusringhääling.

Tikhon Khrennikov criticized Pärt in 1962 for employing serialism in Nekrolog (1960), the first 12-tone music written in Estonia, which exhibited his "susceptibility to foreign influences". But nine months later Pärt won First Prize in a competition of 1,200 works, awarded by the all-Union Society of Composers, indicating the Soviet regime's inability to agree on what was permissible. His first overtly sacred piece, Credo (1968), was a turning point in his career and life; on a personal level he had reached a creative crisis that led him to renounce the techniques and means of expression used so far; on a social level the religious nature of this piece resulted in him being unofficially censured and his music disappearing from concert halls. For the next eight years he composed very little, focusing instead on study of medieval and Renaissance music to find his new musical language. In 1972 he converted from Lutheranism to Orthodox Christianity.

Pärt reemerged as a composer in 1976 with music in his new compositional style and technique, tintinnabuli.

On 10 December 2011, Pope Benedict XVI appointed Pärt a member of the Pontifical Council for Culture for a five-year renewable term.

In 2014 The Daily Telegraph described Pärt as possibly "the world's greatest living composer" and "by a long way, Estonia's most celebrated export". When asked how Estonian he felt his music to be, Pärt replied: "I don't know what is Estonian... I don't think about these things." Unlike many of his fellow Estonian composers, Pärt never found inspiration in the country's epic poem, Kalevipoeg, even in his early works. Pärt said, "My Kalevipoeg is Jesus Christ."

Music

Overview
Familiar works by Pärt are Cantus in Memoriam Benjamin Britten for string orchestra and bell (1977) and the string quintet Fratres I (1977, revised 1983), which he transcribed for string orchestra and percussion, the solo violin "Fratres II" and the cello ensemble "Fratres III" (both 1980).

Pärt is often identified with the school of minimalism and, more specifically, that of mystic minimalism or holy minimalism. He is considered a pioneer of the latter style, along with contemporaries Henryk Górecki and John Tavener. Although his fame initially rested on instrumental works such as Tabula Rasa and Spiegel im Spiegel, his choral works have also come to be widely appreciated.

In this period of Estonian history, Pärt was unable to encounter many musical influences from outside the Soviet Union except for a few illegal tapes and scores. Although Estonia had been an independent state at the time of Pärt's birth, the Soviet Union occupied it in 1940 as a result of the Soviet–Nazi Molotov–Ribbentrop Pact; and the country would then remain under Soviet domination—except for the three-year period of German wartime occupation—for the next 51 years.

Development

Pärt's works are generally divided into two periods. He composed his early works using a range of neo-classical styles influenced by Shostakovich, Prokofiev, and Bartók. He then began to compose using Schoenberg's twelve-tone technique and serialism. This, however, not only earned the ire of the Soviet establishment but also proved to be a creative dead-end. When early works were banned by Soviet censors, Pärt entered the first of several periods of contemplative silence, during which he studied choral music from the 14th to 16th centuries. In this context, Pärt's biographer, Paul Hillier, observed that "he had reached a position of complete despair in which the composition of music appeared to be the most futile of gestures, and he lacked the musical faith and willpower to write even a single note."

In his work Credo (1968), written for solo piano, orchestra, and chorus, he employed avant-garde techniques. This work differed from his earlier atonal and tintinnabula works in its forms and context. Inspired by 14th and 16th century liturgical music, he used a poly-stylistic compositional technique to express his faith in God while incorporating avant-garde techniques of the 20th century. By definition, a credo expresses beliefs and guides religious action, and in his work it represents his faith in God. The Soviets eventually banned the work due to its clear religious context, even though it incorporated avant-garde and a constructivist procedure.

The spirit of early European Polyphony informed the composition of Pärt's transitional Third Symphony (1971); thereafter he immersed himself in early music, reinvestigating the roots of Western music. He studied plainsong, Gregorian chant and the emergence of polyphony in the European Renaissance.

The music that began to emerge after this period was radically different. This period of new compositions included the 1977 works Fratres, Cantus in Memoriam Benjamin Britten and Tabula Rasa. Pärt describes the music of this period as "tintinnabuli"—like the ringing of bells. Spiegel im Spiegel (1978) is a well-known example that has been used in many films. The music is characterised by simple harmonies, often single unadorned notes, or triads, which form the basis of Western harmony. These are reminiscent of ringing bells. Tintinnabuli works are rhythmically simple and do not change tempo. Another characteristic of Pärt's later works is that they are frequently settings for sacred texts, although he mostly chooses Latin or the Church Slavonic language used in Orthodox liturgy instead of his native Estonian language. Large-scale works inspired by religious texts include Berliner Messe, St. John Passion and Te Deum; the author of the famous text of Litany is the 4th-century theologian John Chrysostom. Choral works from this period include Magnificat and The Beatitudes.

Reception and later compositions 

Pärt was the most performed living composer in the world from 2011 to 2018, but then the second-most performed composer, after John Williams. In 2022, Avro was back to the top in Bachtrack.Of Pärt's popularity, Steve Reich has written:

Pärt's music came to public attention in the West largely thanks to Manfred Eicher who recorded several of Pärt's compositions for ECM Records starting in 1984. Pärt wrote Cecilia, vergine romana on an Italian text about life and martyrdom of Saint Cecilia, the patron saint of music, for choir and orchestra on a commission for the Great Jubilee in Rome, where it was performed, close to her feast day on 22 November, by the Accademia Nazionale di Santa Cecilia conducted by Myung-whun Chung.

Invited by Walter Fink, Pärt was the 15th composer featured in the annual Komponistenporträt of the Rheingau Musik Festival in 2005 in four concerts. Chamber music included Für Alina for piano, played by himself, Spiegel im Spiegel and Psalom for string quartet. The chamber orchestra of the Bavarian Radio Symphony Orchestra played his Trisagion, Fratres and Cantus along with works of J.S. Bach. The Windsbach Boys Choir and soloists Sibylla Rubens, Ingeborg Danz, Markus Schäfer and Klaus Mertens performed Magnificat and Collage über B-A-C-H together with two Bach cantatas and one by Mendelssohn.

A composition, Für Lennart, written for the memory of the Estonian President, Lennart Meri, was played at Meri's funeral service on 26 March 2006.

In response to the murder of the Russian investigative journalist Anna Politkovskaya in Moscow on 7 October 2006, Pärt declared that all of his works performed in 2006 and 2007 would be in honour of her death, issuing the following statement: "Anna Politkovskaya staked her entire talent, energy and—in the end—even her life on saving people who had become victims of the abuses prevailing in Russia."

Pärt was honoured as the featured composer of the 2008 Raidió Teilifís Éireann Living Music Festival in Dublin, Ireland. He was also commissioned by Louth Contemporary Music Society to compose a new choral work based on "Saint Patrick's Breastplate", which premiered in 2008 in Louth, Ireland. The new work, The Deer's Cry, is his first Irish commission, and received its debut in Drogheda and Dundalk in February 2008.

Pärt's 2008 Fourth Symphony is named Los Angeles and was dedicated to Mikhail Khodorkovsky. It was Pärt's first symphony written since his Third Symphony of 1971. It premiered in Los Angeles, California, at the Walt Disney Concert Hall on 10 January 2009, and was nominated for a Grammy Award for Best Classical Contemporary Composition in 2010.

On 26 January 2014, Tõnu Kaljuste, conducting the Estonian Philharmonic Chamber Choir, the Sinfonietta Riga, the Tallinn Chamber Orchestra, the Latvian Radio Choir and the Vox Clamantis ensemble, won a Grammy for Best Choral Performance for a performance of Pärt's Adam's Lament. Describing aspects of Pärt's music as "glocal" in approach, Estonian musicologist Kerri Kotta noted that the composer "has been able to translate something very human into sound that crosses the borders normally separating people."

Awards 
 1996 – American Academy of Arts and Letters Department of Music
 1996 – Honorary Doctor of Music, University of Sydney
 1998 – Honorary Doctor of Arts, University of Tartu
 2003 – Honorary Doctor of Music, Durham University
 2006 – Order of the National Coat of Arms 1st Class
 2007 – Brückepreis
 2008 – Léonie Sonning Music Prize, Denmark
 2008 – Austrian Cross of Honour for Science and Art, First Class
 2009 – Foreign Member, Serbian Academy of Sciences and Arts
 2010 – Honorary Doctor of Music, University of St Andrews
 2011 – Chevalier (Knight) of Légion d'honneur, France
 2011 – Membership of the Pontifical Council for Culture
 2013 – Archon of the Ecumenical Patriarchate
 2014 – Recipient of the Praemium Imperiale award, Japan
 2014 – Honorary Doctor of Sacred Music, Saint Vladimir's Orthodox Theological Seminary
 2016 – Honorary Doctor of Music, University of Oxford
 2017 – Ratzinger Prize, Germany
2018 – Gold Medal for Merit to Culture – Gloria Artis, Poland
 2018 – Honorary Doctor of Music, Fryderyk Chopin University of Music
 2019 – Cross of Recognition, 2nd Class, Latvia
 2020 – Frontiers of Knowledge Award, BBVA Foundation, Spain
 2021 – Order of Merit of the Federal Republic of Germany
 2022 – Officer of the Order of the Oak Crown, Luxembourg

Personal life
In 1980, after a prolonged struggle with Soviet officials, he was allowed to emigrate with his wife and their two sons. He lived first in Vienna, where he took Austrian citizenship, and then relocated to Berlin in 1981. He returned to Estonia around the turn of the 21st century and for a while lived alternately in Berlin and Tallinn. He speaks fluent German as a result of living in Germany from 1981.

He converted to Orthodox Christianity in 1972 upon marrying his second wife, Nora.

In 2010, the Pärt family established The Arvo Pärt Centre, an institution responsible for maintaining his personal archive, in the village of Laulasmaa. A new building of the centre opened to the visitors on 17 October 2018, containing a concert hall, a library, and research facilities. The centre also offers educational programmes for children and operates as an international information centre on Pärt's life and work.

In April 2020, although Pärt rarely gives interviews, he spoke to the Spanish newspaper ABC about the coronavirus crisis.

See also 
List of Estonian composers

Citations and references

Cited sources 
 Hillier, Paul. (1997). Arvo Pärt. Oxford : Oxford University Press.  (paper)

Further reading 
Chikinda, Michael (2011). "Pärt's Evolving Tintinnabuli Style". Perspectives of New Music 49, no. 1 (Winter): pp. 182–206
Pärt, Arvo; Enzo Restagno; Leopold Brauneiss; Saala Kareda (2012). Arvo Pärt in Conversation, translated from the German by Robert Crow. Estonian Literature Series. Champaign, IL: Dalkey Archive Press 
Shenton, Andrew (ed.) (2012). The Cambridge Companion to Arvo Pärt. Cambridge: Cambridge University Press 
Shenton, Andrew (2018). Arvo Pärt's Resonant Texts: Choral and Organ Music 1956–2015. Cambridge: Cambridge University Press
Dolp, Laura (ed.) (2019). Arvo Pärt's White Light: Media, Culture, Politics. Cambridge: Cambridge University Press
Bouteneff, Peter; Jeffers Engelhardt; Robert Saler (eds.) (2020). Arvo Pärt: Sounding the Sacred. New York: Fordham University Press

External links 

 Arvo Pärt biography and works on the UE website (publisher)
 Arvo Pärt discography at Classical Net
 Arvo Pärt Conference at Boston University
 Arvo Pärt – extensive site
 Biography in MUSICMATCH Guide – small biography and list of works.
 Arvo Pärt and the New Simplicity  – article by Bill McGlaughlin, with audio selections
 Steve Reich about Arvo Pärt, in an interview with Richard Williams, The Guardian, 2 January 2004
 Spike Magazine Interview
 Lancing College Commission Original Claudio Records Recording in the presence of the composer – Review/Information (archived)
 Arvo Pärt Centre – most up-to-date info and more
 

 
1935 births
20th-century classical composers
21st-century classical composers
ECM Records artists
Composers for pipe organ
Eastern Orthodox Christians from Estonia
Estonian film score composers
Male film score composers
Living people
Minimalist composers
People from Paide
Postmodern composers
Male classical composers
Postminimalist composers
Benjamin Britten
Recipients of the Order of the National Coat of Arms, 1st Class
Recipients of the Order of the National Coat of Arms, 2nd Class
Recipients of the Cross of the Order of Merit of the Federal Republic of Germany
Estonian Academy of Music and Theatre alumni
Converts to Eastern Orthodoxy from Lutheranism
Members of the Pontifical Council for Culture
Classical composers of church music
Estonian expatriates in Germany
Estonian expatriates in Austria
Recipients of the Léonie Sonning Music Prize
Recipients of the Medal for Merit to Culture – Gloria Artis
Herder Prize recipients
Recipients of the Praemium Imperiale
20th-century Estonian composers
21st-century Estonian composers
Ratzinger Prize laureates
Foreign members of the Serbian Academy of Sciences and Arts